Survivor Srbija VIP: Costa Rica is the fourth season of the Serbian version of the Survivor television series, created by Vision Team production company and broadcast by Prva Srpska Televizija.

This is also the second season of the VIP format and the first season with contestants from Croatia.

The VIP season of Survivor Srbija is an international co-production recorded in Costa Rica for the first time.

In addition to Serbia, the show was broadcast in Croatia (RTL Televizija), Bosnia and Herzegovina (Televizija OBN), Macedonia (Sitel televizija) and Montenegro (PRO TV).

Featuring 18 contestants (9 men and 9 women), broadcast started on March 12, 2012.

The show is hosted by Andrija Milošević and for the first time Marijana Batinić.

Island of Dropped was again in play (in second season the name was "Ghost Island"): voted out players would be sent to Island of Dropped and participate in duels, with the winner remaining there until either the next duel or until two specific points where players were brought back into the game.

Vladimir "Vlada" Vuksanović was named the winner in the final episode on June 2, 2012, defeating Milan Gromilić, Nikola Šoć and Sebastijan Flajs with a vote of 6-5-2-0. He won a prize of €50.000.

Contestants

The total votes is the number of votes a castaway has received during Tribal Councils where the castaway is eligible to be voted out of the game.  It does not include the votes received during the final Tribal Council.

The game
Cycles in this article refer to the three-day periods in the game (unless indicated), composed of at least the Immunity Challenge and the subsequent Tribal Council.

In the case of multiple tribes or castaways who win reward or immunity, they are listed in order of finish, or alphabetically where it was a team effort; where one castaway won and invited others, the invitees are in brackets.

 Through cycle 1 to 11 the winner of challenge had the opportunity to choose "Double Vote" or "Black Vote", and at cycle 12 the challenge was "Place in the Final" where the remaining castaways compete in three final challenges for a place in the final.

 Tribal chiefs are leaders of his tribes. They are voted from the rest of the tribal members and they have Individual Immunity during Tribal Council. Every cycle tribes choose another Tribal chief and one member can't be chief two times in a row.

 In a new twist, every eliminated castaway had the opportunity to throw a curse on one member of his former tribe. Before s/he went on Island of Dropped, s/he will vote for one member and that vote will count during the next Tribal Council.

 Radovan chose to go into exile, so one vote would be against him on the next Tribal Council.

 Because Milan played the Hidden Immunity Idol, five votes against him did not count.

 Aleks won a Special Immunity and she can't be voted out until second to last Tribal Council, but until then she must win in one Immunity challenge and one Special challenge and she will be the first finalist. She won only one Special challenge and no Immunity, so she failed.

 Marko won the last challenge on Island of Dropped, so he is back in merge tribe, but he must to choose one eliminated player to join him in new tribe; Marko chose Neven, so merge tribe is complete.

 Sebastijan gave his immunity to Nikola.

Voting history
Tribal Council (TC) numbers are almost the same as Cycle numbers, as a Tribal Council occurs at the end of each cycle; eliminations that happen outside a Tribal Council do not bear a Tribal Council number, but count towards a cycle. Episode numbers denote the episode(s) when the voting and subsequent revelation of votes and elimination during a Tribal Council took place. They can also denote the episode wherein a contestant officially left the game for any reason.

Votes in brackets are an opportunity to eliminate a castaway to throw a curse on one member of his former tribe. That vote will count during the next Tribal Council.

 This castaway could not vote at Tribal Council, because s/he had the "Black Vote necklace".

 Because Aleks had Individual Immunity, this vote against her did not count.

 This vote did not count because of the merge.

 At 11th Tribal Council, the castaways voted out two persons, although they voted only one time.

 Ava is a favorite of the audience, and thereby acquired the right of double vote.

References

External links
 Fan site
 Official site

Serbia
Survivor Srbija
2012 Serbian television seasons
Television shows filmed in Costa Rica